He Zizhen (20 September 1910 – 19 April 1984) was the third wife of Chairman Mao Zedong from 1928 to 1937.

Early life and career

He Zizhen was born in Yunshan (云山, now Yongxin County), Jiangxi, during the Qing dynasty and joined the Communist Youth League of China in 1925. She attended a Protestant school in her youth. She later graduated from the Yongxin Girls' School and joined the Chinese Communist Party in 1926.

Revolutionary life
He Zizhen was introduced to Mao Zedong at Jinggangshan by Yuan Wencai, a classmate of her elder brother, in the spring of 1928. An expert in guerrilla warfare and a capable fighter, He Zizhen was also an excellent shooter who earned the nickname of "Two-Gunned Girl General". She and Mao married in 1928 and had six children together. When they married, Mao had not divorced his second wife Yang Kaihui, whom he had wed in 1920. Yang was arrested and executed in 1930 by the Kuomintang.

He Zizhen had three daughters and three sons with Mao Zedong, but except for their daughter, Li Min, all of them either died young or were separated from the family. Their eldest daughter, who was left to a local family in Fujian, was found and recognized by He Zizhen's brother in 1973, but never had the chance to meet Mao or He.

Two English researchers who retraced the entire Long March in 2002–2003 located a woman whom they believe might be a missing child left in the care of others by Mao and He in 1935.

In 1937, He Zizhen traveled to the Soviet Union for treatment of a wound suffered earlier in battle, later attending the Moscow East University.

While He Zizhen was in Russia, Mao courted Jiang Qing, who would become his fourth wife. He Zizhen was reportedly "dispatched to a mental asylum in Moscow to make room for Jiang". Upon her return to China in 1947, she found she could not hope to fulfill any sort of political role in Beijing. She later became the chair of Zhejiang Province Women's Union. In 1984, He Zizhen died alone in Shanghai.

Legacy
In 2007, a memorial hall was opened in Yongxin for He Zizhen with her daughter, Li Min, present as a guest.

References

Citations

Sources

 
 
 
 
 
 
 
 Karl, Rebecca. Mao Zedong and China in the Twentieth-Century World. (2010). Durham: Duke UP. 

1910 births
1984 deaths
Mao Zedong family
People from Ji'an
Wives of national leaders
Women in war 1900–1945
Women in war in China
Communist University of the Toilers of the East alumni
Members of the 5th Chinese People's Political Consultative Conference
Secretaries to Mao Zedong